La Bayadère ("the temple dancer") (ru. «Баядерка», Bayaderka) is a ballet, originally staged in four acts and seven tableaux by French choreographer Marius Petipa to the music of Ludwig Minkus. The ballet was staged especially for the benefit performance of the Russian Prima ballerina Ekaterina Vazem, who created the principal role of Nikiya. From the first performance the ballet was universally hailed by contemporary critics as one of the choreographer Petipa's supreme masterpieces, particularly the scene from the ballet known as The Kingdom of the Shades, which became one of the most celebrated pieces in all of classical ballet. By the turn of the 20th century, The Kingdom of the Shades scene was regularly extracted from the full-length work as an independent showpiece, and it has remained so to the present day.

Nearly all modern versions of La Bayadère are derived from the Kirov Ballet's production of 1941, which was a severely redacted edition staged by Vakhtang Chabukiani and Vladimir Ponomarev in Leningrad in 1941. Natalia Makarova's 1980 production of La Bayadère for American Ballet Theatre was the first full-length production to find a permanent place in the repertories of western ballet troupes, having been staged by several theatres throughout the world. Makarova's version is itself derived from Chabukiani and Ponomarev's 1941 redaction for the Mariinsky Theatre.

Origins 
La Bayadère was the creation of the dramatist Sergei Khudekov and of Marius Petipa, the renowned Premier maître de ballet of the St. Petersburg Imperial Theatres. The music was composed by Ludwig Minkus, who from 1871 until 1886 held the official post of Ballet Composer to the St. Petersburg Imperial Theatres.

Plot outline
Khudekov's libretto for La Bayadère (meaning The Temple Dancer or The Temple Maiden) tells the story of the bayadère Nikiya and the warrior Solor, who have sworn eternal fidelity to each other. The High Brahmin, however, is also in love with Nikiya and learns of her relationship with Solor. Moreover, the Rajah Dugmanta of Golconda has selected Solor to wed his daughter Gamzatti (or Hamsatti, as she is known in the original production), and Nikiya, unaware of this arrangement, agrees to dance at the couple's betrothal celebrations.

In his effort to have Solor killed and have Nikiya for himself, the jealous High Brahmin informs the Rajah that the warrior has already vowed eternal love to Nikiya over a sacred fire. But the High Brahmin's plan backfires when, rather than becoming angry with Solor, the Rajah decides that it is Nikiya who must die. Gamzatti, who has eavesdropped on this exchange, summons Nikiya to the palace in an attempt to bribe the bayadère into giving up her beloved. As their rivalry intensifies, Nikiya picks up a dagger in a fit of rage and attempts to kill Gamzatti, only to be stopped in the nick of time by Gamzatti's ayah. Nikiya flees in horror at what she has almost done. As did her father, Gamzatti vows that the bayadère must die.

At the betrothal celebrations Nikiya performs a somber dance while playing her veena. She is then given a basket of flowers which she believes are from Solor, and begins a frenzied and joyous dance. Little does she know that the basket is from Gamzatti, who has concealed beneath the flowers a venomous snake. The bayadère then holds the basket too close and the serpent bites her on the neck. The High Brahmin offers Nikiya an antidote to the poison, but she chooses death rather than life without her beloved Solor.

In the next scene the depressed Solor smokes opium. In his dream-like euphoria he has a vision of Nikiya's shade (or spirit) in a nirvana among the star-lit mountain peaks of the Himalayas called The Kingdom of the Shades. Here, the lovers reconcile among the shades of other bayadères. (In the original 1877 production, this scene took place in an illuminated enchanted palace in the sky.) When Solor awakes, preparations are underway for his wedding to Gamzatti.

In the temple where the wedding is to take place the shade of Nikiya haunts Solor as he dances with Gamzatti. When the High Brahmin joins the couple's hands in marriage, the gods take revenge for Nikiya's murder by destroying the temple and all of its occupants. In an apotheosis, the shades of both Nikiya and Solor are reunited in death and eternal love.

Early productions 
La Bayadère was created especially for the benefit performance of Ekaterina Vazem, Prima ballerina of the St. Petersburg Imperial Theatres. The role of Solor was created by the forty-three-year-old Lev Ivanov, Premier danseur of the St. Petersburg Imperial Theatres, with the classical dances of the character Solor being performed by the younger Pavel Gerdt. The celebrated ballerina Maria Gorshenkova created the role of Gamzatti (or Hamsatti, as the character was known in the original production), while the role of the High Brahmin was created by Nikolai Golts. Dugmanta, the Rajah of Golconda was created by Christian Johansson, former Premier danseur of the St. Petersburg Imperial Theatres and an influential teacher.  The lavish décor was designed by Mikhail Bocharov for Act I-scene 1; Matvei Shishkov for Act I-scene 2 and Act II; Ivan Andreyev for Act III-scene 1 and Act IV-scene 1;  Heinrich Wagner for Act III-scene 2 The Kingdom of the Shades; and Piotr Lambin for the Act IV-scene 2 Apotheosis.

Petipa spent almost six months staging La Bayadère. During rehearsals, Petipa clashed with the Prima ballerina Vazem over the matter of her entrance in the ballet's final Grand pas d'action, while also experiencing many problems with the set designers who constructed the ballet's elaborate stage effects. Petipa was also worried that his new work would play to an empty house, as the Imperial Theatre's Director Baron Karl Kister increased the ticket prices to be higher than that of the Italian Opera, which at that time were expensive. The most celebrated and enduring passage of La Bayadère was Petipa's grand vision scene known as The Kingdom of the Shades. Petipa staged this scene as a Grand pas classique, completely devoid of any dramatic action. His simple and academic choreography was to become one of his most celebrated compositions, with the Sortie des bayadères of the thirty-two member Corps de ballet of shades arguably becoming his most celebrated composition of all.

Petipa's final revival of La Bayadère was first given on  especially for the dual benefit performance of the Imperial Theatre's Premier danseur Pavel Gerdt and the Prima ballerina Mathilde Kschessinskaya. Among Petipa's changes for this revival was the re-setting of the scene The Kingdom of the Shades from an enchanted castle in the sky on a fully lighted stage, to a dark and rocky setting on the peaks of the Himalayas. Petipa increased the number of dancers in the Corps de ballet from thirty-two to forty-eight, making the illusion of descending spirits all the more effective in the famous Sortie des bayadères.

In March 1903, the scene The Kingdom of the Shades was performed independently during a gala performance at Peterhof Palace in honor of a state visit from Kaiser Wilhelm II. This is the earliest known occasion where the scene The Kingdom of the Shades was performed as an independent concert piece.

Vaganova's revival 
On December 13, 1932 the great pedagogue of the Soviet Ballet Agrippina Vaganova presented her version of La Bayadère for the Kirov Ballet (the former Imperial Ballet). Vaganova revised the ballerina's dances for her star pupil Marina Semenova, who danced Nikiya. This included triple pirouettes sur la pointe (on the toes), and fast piqué turns en dehors. Although Vaganova's revival did not find a permanent place in the repertory, her modifications to the Ballerina's dances would become the standard.

The Kirov Ballet's revival of 1941 
In 1940 the Kirov Ballet once again made plans to revive La Bayadère, this time in a staging by the Balletmaster Vladimir Ponomarev and the Premier danseur Vakhtang Chabukiani. This version would be the definitive staging of La Bayadère from which nearly every subsequent production would be based. The Ponomarev/Chabukiani revival of La Bayadère premiered on February 10, 1941 to a resounding success, with Natalia Dudinskaya as Nikiya and Vakhtang Chabukiani as Solor.

The choreography for the character of Nikiya went through a renaissance in when performed by the virtuoso ballerina Dudinskaya, whose revisions to the choreography remain the standard. Although her interpretation of the tragic Nikiya was looked on as unsuitable for the stellar ballerina, she nevertheless excelled in The Kingdom of the Shades, where Petipa's strict academic patterns prevailed. In the Variation de Nikiya (often referred to as the Scarf Duet) Ponomarev and Chabukiani changed the original staging of Petipa – originally, this variation called for Nikiya to perform her variation alone, with a long veil connected by wire to a fly-space above the stage, with the veil flying upward upon the final moments of the variation. The variation was changed so that Solor would now hold one end of the veil as Nikiya danced, departing the stage half-way through her solo offstage. Dudinskaya studded the choreography with multiple tours en arabesque, and included, for the first time, airy splits in her Grand jetés during the Entrée de Nikiya, as well as adding fast piqué turns in the Grand coda. The choreography for Solor went through a renaissance as well with the great Premier danseur Chabukiani in the role. Although the dances for the role of Solor had become far more prominent since La Bayadère had been performed in Imperial Russia, Chabukiani's revisions to the choreography would become the standard for all proceeding male dancers.

In 1977, the Kirov Ballet's 1941 Ponomarev/Chabukiani production of La Bayadère was filmed and later released onto DVD/video with Gabriella Komleva as Nikiya, Tatiana Terekhova as Gamzatti, and Rejen Abdeyev as Solor.

La Bayadère in the West 

Although La Bayadère was considered a classic in Russia, the work was almost completely unknown in the west. The first western production of the scene The Kingdom of the Shades was mounted by Eugenia Feodorova at the Teatro Municipal in Rio de Janeiro, Brazil. It premiered on April 12, 1961 with Bertha Rosanova as Nikiya and Aldo Lotufo as Solor. But it was to be the Kirov Ballet's performance of The Kingdom of the Shades at the Palais Garnier in Paris on July 4, 1961 that roused widespread interest in this almost totally unknown ballet from the Imperial/Petipa repertory. Two years later, Rudolf Nureyev staged the scene for the Royal Ballet with Margot Fonteyn as Nikiya. Minkus's music was re-orchestrated by the Royal Opera House's composer/conductor John Lanchbery. The premiere was a resounding success, and is considered to be among the most important moments in the history of ballet.

The dance critic Arlene Croce commented on Petipa's The Kingdom of the Shades in her review of Makarova's staging of the scene in The New Yorker:

Nureyev's version of The Kingdom of the Shades was also staged by Eugen Valukin for the National Ballet of Canada, premiering on March 27, 1967. The first full-length production of La Bayadère was staged by the Balletmistress Natalie Conus for the Iranian National Ballet Company in 1972, in a production based almost entirely on the 1941 Ponomarev/Chabukiani production for the Kirov Ballet. For this production Minkus' score was orchestrated from a piano reduction by Robin Barker.

The National Ballet of Panama's debut performance was La Bayadère (1972), the principal dancers were Teresa Mann, Ginela Vazquez, Armando Villamil, Nitzia Cucalon, Raisa Gutierrez and Alejandro Lugo.

Natalia Makarova’s production 

In 1974 Natalia Makarova mounted The Kingdom of the Shades for American Ballet Theatre in New York City, being the first staging of any part of La Bayadère in the United States. In 1980 Makarova staged her own version of the full-length work for the company, based largely on the Ponomarev/Chabukiani version she danced during her career with the Kirov Ballet. Makarova's production premiered on May 21, 1980 at the Metropolitan Opera House, and was shown live on PBS during the Live from Lincoln Center broadcast. Makarova danced the role of Nikiya herself, but was replaced by Marianna Tcherkassky due to an injury during the first act. The principal roles included Anthony Dowell as Solor, Cynthia Harvey as Gamzatti, Alexander Minz as the High Brahmin and Victor Barbee as the Rajah. The décor was designed by Pier Luigi Samaritani, with costumes by Theoni V. Aldredge and lighting by Toshiro Ogawa. The premiere was a triumph for American Ballet Theatre, and the company has performed it consistently ever since.

In 1989, Makarova staged her version of La Bayadère for the Royal Ballet in a totally un-changed production, including copies of Samaritani's designs for the décor, and new costumes by Yolanda Sonnabend. In 1990 her production was filmed, and later shown on PBS in 1994 and later released onto DVD/Video. The cast included Altynai Asylmuratova as Nikiya, Darcey Bussell as Gamzatti and Irek Mukhamedov as Solor. Makarova has since staged her production for many companies throughout the world, including the Ballet of La Scala (who have recently filmed their production and released it onto DVD), the Australian Ballet, the Polish National Ballet, the Stanislavsky Ballet in Moscow and the Royal Swedish Ballet.

Rudolf Nureyev's production 
In late 1991, Rudolf Nureyev, artistic director of the Paris Opera Ballet, began making plans for a revival of the full-length La Bayadère, to be derived from the traditional Ponomarev/Chabukiani version he danced during his career with the Kirov Ballet. Nureyev enlisted the assistance of his friend and colleague Ninel Kurgapkina, former Prima Ballerina of the Kirov Ballet, to assist in staging the work. The administration of the Paris Opéra knew that this production of La Bayadère would be Nureyev's last offering to the world, as his health was deteriorating more and more from advanced AIDS disease. Because of this, the cultural administration of the Paris Opéra gave the production an enormous budget, with even more funding coming from various private donations.

Nureyev called upon the Italian opera designer Ezio Frigerio to create the décor, and his wife, opera designer Franca Squarciapino, to create the ballet's costumes. Frigerio took inspiration from the Taj Mahal and the architecture of the Ottoman Empire, as well as drawings of the original décor used for Petipa's 1877 production – Frigerio called his designs "a dream of the Orient through Eastern-European eyes". Squarciapino's costume designs were inspired by ancient Persian and Indian paintings, with elaborate head-dresses and hats, colorful shimmering fabrics, and traditional Indian garb, with much of the materials coming from Parisian boutiques that imported directly from India.

Nureyev's production of La Bayadère was presented for the first time at the Palais Garnier (or the Paris Opéra) on October 8, 1992, with Isabelle Guérin as Nikiya, Laurent Hilaire as Solor, and Élisabeth Platel as Gamzatti (and was later filmed in 1994 and released onto DVD/video with the same cast). The theatre was filled with many of the most prominent people of the ballet world, along with throngs of newspaper and television reporters from around the world. The production was a resounding success, with Nureyev being honored with the prestigious Ordre des Arts et des Lettres from the French Minister of Culture. The premiere of Nureyev's production was a special occasion for many in the world of ballet, as only three months later he died.

The danseur Laurent Hilaire later commented on Nureyev's revival:

Sergei Vikharev's production 
In 2000 the Kirov/Mariinsky Ballet began mounting a new production of Petipa's 1900 revival of La Bayadère.

The choreographer Sergei Vikharev made use of the Stepanov Choreographic Notation from the Sergeyev Collection to assist on mounting the choreography. The production included the long deleted final act, which included the lost Danse des fleurs de lotus (Dance of the Lotus Blossoms) and Petipa's original Grand Pas d'action, which up to that point had been performed during the second act in a revised edition from 1941 as staged by Vladimir Ponomarev and Vakhtang Chabukiani. In spite of the fact that the production was billed as a "reconstruction", Vikharev retained nearly all of the Soviet-era choreography.

For the majority of the 20th century Minkus's original score for La Bayadère was thought to have been lost. Unbeknownst to the company, the Mariinsky Theatre's music library had in their possession two volumes of Minkus's complete, hand-written score of 1877, as well as three manuscript rehearsal répétiteurs in arrangement for two violins, which included many notes for ballet masters and performers. Sergei Vikharev commented on the restoration of Minkus's score:

The Kirov/Mariinsky Ballet opened the 10th International Stars of the White Nights Festival with their reconstruction of La Bayadère at the Mariinsky Theatre on May 31, 2002, with Daria Pavlenko as Nikiya, Elvira Tarasova as Gamzatti, and Igor Kolb as Solor. The production received a mixed reaction from the St. Petersburg audience, which largely comprised the most prominent persons of the Russian ballet. The celebrated Ballerina of the Kirov/Mariinsky Ballet Altynai Asylmuratova was seen weeping after the performance, allegedly because of her shock at seeing the ballet presented in this way. When the company included the production on their tours, it caused a sensation around the world, particularly in New York and London. To date the Kirov/Mariinsky Ballet only perform the Vikharev production on special occasions.

Stanton Welch's production 
Stanton Welch created his version of La Bayadère for the Houston Ballet's 40th season in 2010, with Sara Webb as Nikiya, Connor Walsh as Solor, James Gotesky as the priest and Kelly Myernick as Gamzatti. The set and costumes were designed by Peter Farmer to give an Indian, Bollywood, look. Welch worked with live snakes during the preparation  and they were used in the production. John Lanchbery's arrangement of the music by Ludwig Minkus was further modified by Ermanno Florio, the music director of the Houston Ballet Orchestra.

Welch's version was the first full production of La Bayadère to be staged in Australia, by The Australian Ballet in 2014, with Leanne Stojmenov as Nikiya, Kevin Jackson as Solor and Laura Tong as Gamzatti. Reviewer Michaela Marshall notes particularly the performance of the corps de ballet in the Kingdom of the Shades scene which is danced in the traditional short white tutus.

Other productions 
Among other notable productions is Vladimir Malakhov's staging of La Bayadère for Vienna State Opera in 1999 and for Staatsballett Berlin in 2002.

Ekaterina Vazem on the first production of 'La Bayadère' 

Here is an account by Ekaterina Vazem, Soloist of His Imperial Majesty and Prima Ballerina of the St. Petersburg Imperial Theatres, on the first production of La Bayadère.

References

Sources 

American Ballet Theatre. Program for Natalia Makarova's production of La Bayadère. Metropolitan Opera House, 2000.
Beaumont, Cyril. Complete Book Of Ballets.
Croce, Arlene.  Review titled "Makarova's Miracle", written August 19, 1974, republished in Writing in the Dark, Dancing in 'The New Yorker''' (2000) p. 57.
Greskovic, Robert. Ballet 101.
Guest, Ivor. CD Liner Notes. Léon Minkus, arr. John Lanchbery. La Bayadère. Richard Bonynge Cond. English Chamber Orchestra. Decca 436 917-2.
Hall, Coryne. Imperial Dancer: Mathilde Kschessinska and the Romanovs.
Imperial Mariinsky Theatre. Yearbook of the Imperial Theatres 1900–1901. St. Petersburg, Russian Empire. 1901.
Kschessinskaya, Mathilde Felixovna (Princess Romanovsky-Krassinsky). Dancing in St. Petersburg – The Memoirs of Kschessinska. Trans. Arnold Haskell.
Kirov/Mariinsky Ballet. Souvenir program for the reconstruction of Petipa's 1900 revival of La Bayadère. Mariinsky Theatre, 2002.
Petipa, Marius. The Diaries of Marius Petipa. Trans. and Ed. Lynn Garafola. Published in Studies in Dance History. 3.1 (Spring 1992).
Petipa, Marius. Memuary Mariusa Petipa solista ego imperatorskogo velichestva i baletmeistera imperatorskikh teatrov (The Memoirs of Marius Petipa, Soloist of His Imperial Majesty and Ballet Master of the Imperial Theatres).
Royal Ballet. Program for Natalia Makarova's production of La Bayadère. Royal Opera House, 1990.
Stegemann, Michael. CD Liner notes. Trans. Lionel Salter. Léon Minkus. Paquita & La Bayadère. Boris Spassov Cond. Sofia National Opera Orchestra. Capriccio 10 544.
Vazem, Ekaterina Ottovna. Ekaterina Ottovna Vazem – Memoirs of a Ballerina of the St. Petersburg Imperial Bolshoi Kamenny Theatre, 1867–1884. Trans. Roland John Wiley.
Wiley, Roland John. Dances from Russia: An Introduction to the Sergeyev Collection Published in The Harvard Library Bulletin, 24.1 January 1976.
Wiley, Roland John, ed. and translator. A Century of Russian Ballet: Documents and Eyewitness Accounts 1810–1910.
Wiley, Roland John. Tchaikovsky's Ballets''.

External links 
 La Bayadère – Rudolf Nureyev Foundation
 Why The Royal Ballet love performing La Bayadère – Royal Ballet

Ballets by Marius Petipa
Ballets by Ludwig Minkus
1877 ballet premieres
Ballets premiered at the Bolshoi Theatre, Saint Petersburg